Sociedad Deportiva Aucas, also known as "Papá Aucas", is a football club based in Quito, Ecuador. They play in the top tier of Ecuadorian football and have spent the majority of their history in the top-flight Serie A. The team is amongst the most popular in the city because of its long history in the Serie A. Aucas is the current champion of the Ecuadorian league. The team also has a major rivalry in L.D.U. Quito, which they contest one of the most prestigious derbies in all of Ecuador, and the most prestigious in Quito.

Overview
The team is named after the Auca tribe, who are also called Huaorani. The club originally belonged to Royal Dutch Shell, which had been operating oil fields in the east of Ecuador where the Aucas live. The club's main uniforms colours, yellow and red, were taken from the colours used by Shell to market their products and services. The alternate uniform is grey, except for the commercial advertisements and numbers and names of players, which are red.

Players who have played for Aucas include Argentinian and nationalised Ecuadorian forward Ariel Graziani, forward Nicolás Asencio, forward Agustin Delgado, forward Édison Maldonado, Ecuador international defender Giovanny Espinoza, and the 1990 FIFA World Cup Colombian goalkeeper René Higuita.

Aucas won their first Serie A title in 2022 under the tenure of Venezuelan manager César Farías by winning the competition's second stage without losing a single game and then beating Barcelona in the finals. This win also qualified them to the 2023 Copa Libertadores, the first time they will compete in the continental tournament.

Honours

Regional
Campeonato Amateur del Fútbol de Pichincha (6): 1945, 1946, 1947, 1948, 1949, 1951
Campeonato Professional Interandino (2): 1959, 1962
National
Serie A (1): 2022
Serie B (3): 1974 E2, 1991 E2, 2014
Segunda Categoría (2): 1986 E2, 2012

Players

Current squad

World Cup players
The following players were chosen to represent their country at the FIFA World Cup while contracted to Aucas.

 Giovanny Espinoza (2002)
 Damián Lanza (2006)
 Hernán Galíndez (2022)

Managers
 Ernesto Guerra (1975), (1986–87), (1989)
 Carlos Cuvi (1995)
 Polo Carrera (1995)
 Leonel Montoya (1996)
 Alfredo Encalada (1994, 1996)
 Homero Mistral Valencia (1995, 1996–1997)
 Juan Ramón Silva (1998–99)
 Ramiro Blacut (1999–00)
 Gerardo Pelusso (2001–02)
 Salvador Raguza (2002)
 Adan Machado (2002)
 Carlos Sevilla (2003)
 Luis Fernando Suárez (2003–04)
 Javier Álvarez Arteaga (2004–05)
 Dragan Miranović (2005-2006)
 Diego Aguirre (2006)
 Fausto Carrera (2006)
 Juan Amador Sánchez (2006–07)
 Fernando Rodriguez Riolfo (2007)
 Carlos Berrueta (2007)
 Miguel Ángel Zahzú (2008)
 Carlos Calderón (2008)
 Marco Etcheverry (2009)
 Polo Carrera (2009)
 Alfredo Encalada (2011–12)
 Julio Asad (2012–13)
 Juan Ramón Silva (2014)
 Carlos Ischia (2015–16)
 Tabare Silva (2016)
 Armando Osma (2009, 2016–2017)
 Darío Tempesta (2017, 2020–2021)
 Luis Soler (2018)
 Eduardo Favaro (2019)
 Gabriel Schurrer (2019)
 Hector Bidoglio (2021)

External links
Fan website 

 
Aucas
Aucas, Sociedad Deportiva
Aucas
1945 establishments in Ecuador
Aucas